Zo Artzeinu (This is our land) was a right-wing nationalist political protest movement created and led by Moshe Feiglin and Shmuel Sackett in Israel to block Israeli land concessions to the Arabs in the early 1990s, especially the Oslo Accords. The movement was known to block roads and use other forms of civil disobedience adapted from the civil rights movement in the United States to make known their protests and goals.

Feiglin and Sackett established Zo Artzeinu in December 1993. In summer 1995 Zo Artzeinu supported demonstrations against the government of Yitzak Rabin, accusing Rabin of "selling Israel to the Arabs and pushing the country towards war". The movement's leaders were arrested in early September, accused of inciting revolt among settlers. At a large Zo Artzeinu demonstration on 14 September, fifty people were injured. Yigal Amir, who assassinated Rabin in November 1995, was found to have links to Kach, Eyal Group and Zo Artzeinu.

In March 1996 Zo Artzeinu leader Binyamin Elon appeared on the Moledet electoral list, and gained a Knesset seat in the May general election. In 1998, Feiglin and Sackett moved on to establish the Manhigut Yehudit ("Jewish Leadership") faction within the Likud party, with Feiglin eventually running for leadership of the Likud party. Other Zo Artzeinu members joined Israel Beiteinu in 1999.

References

External links
Official website (in English)

Civil disobedience
Political organizations based in Israel
Organizations established in 1993
1993 establishments in Israel
Right-wing politics in Israel